Bernice Chauly (born 1968, Georgetown, Penang) is Malaysian writer, poet, educator, festival director, actor, photographer and filmmaker.

Biography 
Born to Chinese-Punjabi teachers, she read Education and English Literature at the University of Winnipeg, Canada as a government scholar.

She is the author of seven books, which include poetry and prose; going there and coming back (1997), The Book of Sins (2008), Lost in KL (2008), the acclaimed memoir Growing Up With Ghosts (2011) which won in the Popular Readers’ Choice Awards 2012 in the Non-Fiction Category, Onkalo (2013), her third collection of poems which Nobel laureate J.M Coetzee has said is "direct, honest and powerful", Once We Were There (2017) published by Epigram Books, Incantations/Incarcerations (2019) published by Gerakbudaya. 

In 1998, she began organising literary events in Kuala Lumpur and in 2005, founded Readings, the longest-running live literary platform in Kuala Lumpur. In 2011, she was Festival Director for the Writers Unlimited Tour Kuala Lumpur/Makassar and is the Festival Director of the George Town Literary Festival in Penang (2011 – 2018), the only international literature festival in Malaysia. The festival was awarded The Literary Festival Award at the London Book Fair (2019). The award judges stated that "the GTLF stands outs a vibrant, diverse and brave festival that engages with a wide community of voices, speaking to the world from a complex region." She was also the co-curator of at Read My World International Literature Festival Amsterdam (2015). In 2018, Chauly formed PEN Malaysia and was nominated as Director in 2019. PEN Malaysia aims to uphold freedoms of speech and expression in Malaysia and to conduct key events to foster literacy and the love of literature amongst its multicultural society.  

She was a resident at the University of Iowa's International Writing Program in 2014 and is the Founder and Director of the KL Writers Workshop. She currently teaches creative writing at the University of Nottingham Malaysia Campus. 
For over 20 years, she worked extensively in the creative industries and won multiple awards for her work and her contribution to the arts in Malaysia.

Bibliography

 (2019) 
 (2017) 
 (2013) 
 (2011) 
 (2008) 
 (2008) 
 (1997)

References

1968 births
Living people
People from Penang
Malaysian writers
Malaysian poets
Malaysian people of Punjabi descent
Malaysian people of Chinese descent
Malaysian women poets